My Music was a radio panel show which premiered on the BBC Home Service on 3 January 1967. It was a companion programme to My Word!, and like that show featured comic writers Denis Norden and Frank Muir. The show was last recorded in November 1993 and broadcast in January 1994, then rebroadcast until 2011. It was also broadcast via the BBC World Service.  There was also a television version on BBC2 which ran for seven series between 1977 and 1983.

Description
My Music followed My Word!s pattern of two teams of two competing in a series of challenges, based this time on music rather than words.  Again, the quiz element was subordinate to the entertainment.  In later years, each episode featured a final round in which each contestant was required to sing a song, regardless of his vocal ability.  Initially, this was a genuine test of whether the contestants knew the songs, but later the songs were always ones that they were certain to know.  Indeed, towards the end Denis Norden decided what song he would sing, supplying some rather bizarre ones.  Many of these were written by the English music hall songwriters R. P. Weston and Bert Lee.

The teams were:
 1967–1973: Ian Wallace and Denis Norden versus David Franklin and Frank Muir
 1973: Ian Wallace and Denis Norden versus Owen Brannigan and Frank Muir
 1974–1994: Ian Wallace and Denis Norden versus John Amis and Frank Muir (these four participants also contested the TV version)

The show was hosted for its entire run by composer Steve Race, who also set the challenges (after an early period in which they were set by show creator Edward J. Mason) and provided piano accompaniment where appropriate (except in the first five series, in which accompaniment was provided by Graham Dalley on mellotron). Neither Race nor Wallace missed a single one of the more than 520 episodes broadcast.

Graham Dalley, the show's first accompanist, also composed the signature tune, and his original mellotron version was used from 1967 to 1975. A new arrangement of the theme, featuring trumpets, bass guitar, electric guitar, conga drums, and cabasa, was used from 1976, and was succeeded in 1983 by an arrangement for piano and harpsichord, composed by Steve Race.

Producers of the programme included Tony Shryane and Pete Atkin.

In the United States, the show was syndicated on the WFMT Fine Arts Network until 1 October 2013, when BBC ended US distribution.

 Episode Guide Series 1 (3 January – 28 March 1967 - 13 episodes)The programmes were broadcast each Tuesday night at 9.00 pm on the BBC Home Service and were recorded before an invited audience at the 'Paris' Studio, Lower Regent Street, London.

 Tuesday 3 January 1967 (recorded 31 July 1967)
 Tuesday 10 January 1967
 Tuesday 17 January 1967
 Tuesday 24 January 1967
 Tuesday 31 January 1967
 Tuesday 7 February 1967
 Tuesday 14 February 1967
 Tuesday 21 February 1967 (Lionel Hale stands in for Frank Muir who is indisposed)
 Tuesday 28 February 1967
 Tuesday 7 March 1967
 Tuesday 14 March 1967
 Tuesday 21 March 1967
 Tuesday 28 March 1967Series 2 (4 October 1967 to 10 January 1968 -  15 episodes)The programmes were broadcast each Wednesday night at 7.00 pm and repeated the following Tuesday at 12.25 pm on BBC Radio 4.

There was no broadcast on Wednesday 22 November 1967; the evening was devoted to a recording of CARMEN from the 1967 Salzburg Festival which was made available by courtesy of Austrian Radio.  Researchers have indicated that while My Music was not broadcast on this date, it was broadcast in its repeat slot on 28 Nov 67. It would appear that this episode was not included in BBC Transcription Service LP's of the programme.

 Wednesday 4 October 1967 repeated Tuesday 10 October 1967
 Wednesday 11 October 1967 repeated Tuesday 17 October 1967
 Wednesday 18 October 1967 repeated Tuesday 24 October 1967
 Wednesday 25 October 1967 repeated Tuesday 31 October 1967
 Wednesday 1 November 1967 repeated Tuesday 7 November 1967
 Wednesday 8 November 1967 repeated Tuesday 14 November 1967
 Wednesday 15 November 1967 repeated Tuesday 21 November 1967
 Tuesday 28 November 1967
 Wednesday 29 November 1967 repeated Tuesday 5 December 1967
 Wednesday 6 December 1967 repeated Tuesday 12 December 1967 
 Wednesday 13 December 1967 repeated Tuesday 19 December 1967
 Wednesday 20 December 1967 repeated Tuesday 26 December 1967
 Wednesday 27 December 1967 repeated Tuesday 2 January 1968
 Wednesday 3 January 1968 repeated Tuesday 9 January 1968
 Wednesday 10 January 1968 repeated Tuesday 16 January 1968Series 3 (29 April  to 22 July 1968 – 13 episodes)The programmes were broadcast each Monday night at 7.00 pm and repeated the following Sunday at 12.25 pm on BBC Radio 4.

 Monday 29 April 1968 repeated Sunday 5 May 1968
 Monday 6 May 1968 repeated Sunday 12 May 1968
 Monday 13 May 1968 repeated Sunday 19 May 1968
 Monday 20 May 1968 repeated Sunday 26 May 1968
 Monday 27 May 1968 repeated Sunday 2 June 1968  (Michael Flanders stands in for Frank Muir)
 Monday 3 June 1968 repeated Sunday 9 June 1968
 Monday 10 June 1968 repeated Sunday 16 June 1968
 Monday 17 June 1968 repeated Sunday 23 June 1968
 Monday 24 June 1968 repeated Sunday 30 June 1968
 Monday 1 July 1968 repeated Sunday 7 July 1968
 Monday 8 July 1968 repeated Sunday 14 July 1968
 Monday 15 July 1968 repeated Sunday 21 July 1968
 Monday 22 July 1968 repeated Sunday 28 July 1968Series 4  (10 March to 2 June 1969 – 13 episodes)The programmes were broadcast each Monday night at 7.00 pm and repeated the following Sunday at 12.25 pm on BBC Radio 4.

 Monday 19 March 1969 repeated Sunday 16 March 1969
 Monday 17 March 1969 repeated Sunday 23 March 1969
 Monday 24 March 1969 repeated Sunday 30 March 1969  (Barry Took stands in for Frank Muir)
 Monday 31 March 1969 repeated Sunday 6 April 1969
 Monday 7 April 1969 repeated Sunday 13 April 1969
 Monday 14 April 1969 repeated Sunday 20 April 1969
 Monday 21 April 1969 repeated Sunday 27 April 1969
 Monday 28 April 1969 repeated Sunday 4 May 1969
 Monday 5 May 1969 repeated Sunday 11 May 1969
 Monday 12 May 1969 repeated Sunday 18 May 1969
 Monday 19 May 1969 repeated Sunday 25 May 1969
 Monday 26 May 1969 repeated Sunday 1 June 1969
 Monday 2 June 1969 repeated Sunday 8 June 1969Series 5 (28 December 1969 to 29 March 1970  - 14 episodes)The programmes were broadcast each Sunday night at 6.30 pm and repeated the following Friday at 7.00pm.

 Sunday 28 December 1969 repeated Friday 2 January 1970
 Sunday 4 January 1970 repeated Friday 9 January 1970
 Sunday 11 January 1970 repeated Friday 17 January 1970
 Sunday 18 January 1970 repeated Friday 23 January 1970
 Sunday 25 January 1970 repeated Friday 30 January 1970
 Sunday 1 February 1970 repeated Friday 6 February 1970
 Sunday 8 February 1970 repeated Friday 13 February 1970
 Sunday 15 February 1970 repeated Friday 20 February 1970
 Sunday 22 February 1970 repeated Friday 27 February 1970
 Sunday 1 March 1970 repeated Friday 6 March 1970
 Sunday 8 March 1970 repeated Friday 13 March 1970
 Sunday 15 March 1970 repeated Friday 20 March 1970
 Sunday 22 March 1970 repeated Friday 27 March 1970
 Sunday 29 March 1970 repeated Friday 3 April 1970Series 6 (28 January 1971 to 22 April 1971 – 13 episodes)The programmes were broadcast each Friday afternoon at 12.25 pm and repeated the following Monday evening at 7.30 pm

 Thursday 28 January 1971 repeated Monday 1 February 1971
 Thursday 4 February 1971 repeated Monday 8 February 1971
 Thursday 11 February 1971 repeated Monday 15 February 1971
 Thursday 18 February 1971 repeated Monday 22 February 1971
 Thursday 25 February 1971 repeated Monday 1 March 1971
 Thursday 4 March 1971 repeated Monday 8 March 1971
 Thursday 11 March 1971 repeated Monday 15 March 1971
 Thursday 18 March 1971 repeated Monday 22 March 1971
 Thursday 25 March 1971 repeated Monday 29 March 1971
 Thursday 1 April 1971 repeated Monday 5 April 1971
 Thursday 8 April 1971 repeated Monday 12 April 1971
 Thursday 15 April 1971 repeated Monday 19 April 1971
 Thursday 22 April 1971 repeated Monday 26 April 1971Series 7  (26 December 1971 to  – 15 episodes)The programmes were broadcast each Sunday evening at 7.00 pm and repeated the following Thursday afternoon 12.25 pm

 Sunday 26 December 1971 
 Sunday 2 January 1972 repeated Thursday 6 January 1972
 Sunday 9 January 1972 repeated Thursday 13 January 1972
 Sunday 16 January 1972 repeated Thursday 20 January 1972
 Sunday 23 January 1972 repeated Thursday 27 January 1972
 Sunday 30 January 1972 repeated Thursday 3 February 1972
 Sunday 6 February 1972 repeated Thursday 10 February 1972
 Sunday 13 February 1972 repeated Thursday 17 February 1972
 Sunday 20 February 1972 repeated Thursday 24 February 1972
 Sunday 27 February 1972 repeated Thursday 2 March 1972
 Sunday 5 March 1972 repeated Thursday 9 March 1972
 Sunday 12 March 1972 repeated Thursday 16 March 1972
 Sunday 19 March 1972 repeated Thursday 23 March 1972
 Sunday 26 March 1972 repeated Thursday 30 March 1972
 Sunday 2 April 1972 repeated Thursday 6 April 1972Special editions Tuesday 20 June 1972  - a special edition for the 150th anniversary of the Royal Academy.  TV cameras were present to film inserts for a David Franklyn programme 'One Pair of Eyes'.
 Wednesday 15 November 1972 - special edition recorded before an invited audience at Pebble Mill, Birmingham to mark the B.B.C. 50th Anniversary recorded 13 November 19Series 8 (25 December 1972 to 25 March 1973 – 14 editions)Special editionMonday 25 December 1972  My Word! It's My Music - A Christmas edition of the two radio panel games with Dilys Powell , David Franklin and Frank Muir who challenge Anne Scott-James , Ian Wallace and Denis Norden. In the chair  Sir Jack Longland and Steve Race who compiled the questions. Broadcast at 7.30pm.Series 18 (9 June - 1 December 1982) Wednesday 9 June 1982 repeated Friday 11 June 1982
 Wednesday 16 June 1982 repeated Friday 18 June 1982
 Wednesday 23 June 1982 repeated Friday 25 June 1982
 Wednesday 30 June 1982 repeated Friday 2 July 1982
 Wednesday 7 July 1982 repeated Friday 9 July 1982
 Wednesday 14 July 1982 repeated Friday 16 July 1982
 Wednesday 21 July 1982 repeated Friday 23 July 1982
 Wednesday 28 July 1982 repeated Friday 30 July 1982
 Wednesday 4 August 1982 repeated Friday 6 August 1982
 Wednesday 11 August 1982 repeated Friday 13 August 1982
 Wednesday 18 August 1982 repeated Friday 20 August 1982
 Wednesday 25 August 1982 repeated Friday 27 August 1982
 Wednesday 1 September 1982 repeated Friday 3 September 1982
 Wednesday 8 September 1982 repeated Friday 10 September 1982
 Wednesday 15 September 1982 repeated Friday 17 September 1982
 Wednesday 22 September 1982 repeated Friday 24 September 1982
 Wednesday 29 September 1982 repeated Friday 1 October 1982
 Wednesday 6 October 1982 repeated Friday 8 October 1982
 Wednesday 13 October 1982 repeated Friday 15 October 1982
 Wednesday 20 October 1982 repeated Friday 22 October 1982
 Wednesday 27 October 1982 repeated Friday 29 October 1982
 Wednesday 3 November 1982 repeated Friday 5 November 1982
 Wednesday 10 November 1982 repeated Friday 12 November 1982
 Wednesday 17 November 1982 repeated Friday 19 November 1982
 Wednesday 24 November 1982 repeated Friday 26 November 1982
 Wednesday 1 December 1982 repeated Friday 3 December 1982Series 25 (27 November 1989 -  22 January 1989 – 8 episodes)The programmes were broadcast each Monday afternoon at 12.25 pm on BBC Radio 4.

 Monday 27 November 1993
 Monday 3 December 1993 
 Monday 11 December 1993
 Monday 18 December 1993
 Monday 1 January 1994
 Monday 8 January 1994
 Monday 15 January 1994
 Monday 22 January 1994Series 26 (3 April 1990 – 22 May 1990 – 8 episodes)The programmes were broadcast each Tuesday afternoon at 12.25 pm on BBC Radio 4.

 Tuesday 3 April 1990
 Tuesday 10 April 1990
 Tuesday 17 April 1990
 Tuesday 24 April 1990
 Tuesday 1 May 1990
 Tuesday 8 May 1990
 Tuesday 15 May 1990
 Tuesday 22 May 1990 (The 500th edition)Series 27 (2 December 1991 to 20 January 1992 - 8 episodes)The programmes were broadcast each Monday afternoon at 12.25pm on BBC Radio 4.

 Monday 2 December 1991
 Monday 9 December 1991
 Monday 16 December 1991
 Monday 23 December 1991
 Monday 30 December 1991
 Monday 6 January 1992
 Monday 13 January 1992
 Monday 20 January 1992Series 28 (6 October 1992 to 24 November 1992 - 8 episodes)The programmes were broadcast each Tuesday  afternoon at 12.25pm on BBC Radio 4.

 Tuesday 6 October 1992 
 Monday 13 October 1992 
 Monday 20 October 1992
 Monday 27 October 1992
 Monday 3 November 1993
 Monday 10 November 1993
 Monday 17 November 1993
 Monday 24 November 1993Series 29 (6 December 1993 – 24 January 1994 - 8 episodes)The programmes were broadcast each Monday afternoon at 12.25pm on BBC Radio 4.

 Monday 6 December 1993 
 Monday 13 December 1993
 Monday 20 December 1993
 Monday 27 December 1993 
 Monday 3 January 1994 
 Monday 10 January 1994 
 Monday 17 January 1994  
 Monday 24 January 1994 (the final programme)

 The Songs 
In the later editions, the four contributors performed their 'Party Pieces', songs or musical items.Series 17Programme 1

 Wonderful One (Frank)
 La Precieuse (John)
 Back in the Old Routine (Dennis)
 The Orderly Song (Ian)

Programme 2

 Auf Wiedershen My Dear (Frank)
 Amor Ti Vieta (Fedora: Giordano) (John)
 And Her Mother Came To (Dennis)
 All the Things You Are (Ian)

Programme 3

 In A Shady Nook (Frank)
 Fairest Isle (John)
 AI Don't Care What You Used to Be (Dennis)
 In the Bath (Ian)

Programme 4

 Rio Rita (Frank)
 Sylvia (John)
 Sarah Sarah (Dennis)
 Juanita (Ian)

Programme 5

 Time on My Hands (Frank)
 Tristesse (John)
 Too Many Rings Around Rosie (Dennis)
 Tonga (Ian)

Programme 6

 Should I (Frank)
 Golden Slumbers Kiss Your Eyes (John)
 Say It With Music (Dennis)
 Smoke Gets in Your Eyes (Ian)
Programme 7

 Maybe It's Because I'm A Londoner(Frank)
 The Lark in the Clear Air (John)
 The Kind of Girl That Men Forget (Dennis)
 Somewhere A Voice is Calling (Ian)

Programme 8

 The Party's Over (Frank)
 I Hear You Calling Me (John)
 Three Meals A Day (Dennis)
 Shenandoah (Ian)

Programme 9

 Have You Ever Been Lonely? (Frank)
 In the Garden Where the Prates Grow (John)
 Shepherd of the Hills (Dennis)
 C'est Magnifique (Ian)

Programme 10

 What A Difference A Day Made (Frank)
 Carol (John)
 I'll Lend You Anything (Dennis)
 White Wings (Ian)

Programme 11

 Perhaps Perhaps Perhaps (Frank)
 None But the Weary Heart (John)
 Poor Butterfly (Dennis)
 In Other Words (Ian)

Programme 12

 As Time Goes By (Frank)
 Love Will Find A Way (John)
 Liza Johnson (Dennis)
 The Young May Moon (Ian)

Programme 13

 I've Got A Pocketful of Dreams (Frank)
 Unknown by Bellini (John)
 Little White Lies (Dennis)
 On A Clear Day You Can See Forever (Ian)

Programme 14

 Dream Lover (Frank)
 The Hunter in His Career (John)
 Lily (Dennis)
 A Farewell (Ian)

Programme 15
 Now I HAVE TO Call Him Father (Frank)
 Oh Waley Waley (John)
 My Silver Bell (Dennis)
 Edelweiss (Ian)Series 18Programme 1

 After the Ball (Frank)
 Die Schöne Müllerin (John)
 Loving Sam (Dennis)
 They Didn't Believe Me (Ian)

Programme 2
 I Want to Be Happy (Frank)
 If Music Be the Food of Love Sing On  (John)
 I'm Gonna Keep on Doing (Dennis)
 They Didn't Believe Me (Ian)

Programme 3

 You'd Be So Nice to Come Home to (Frank Muir)
 Tom Bowley (John Amis)
 My Old Brown Hat (Denis Norden)
 Always (Ian Wallace)

Programme 4

 The Rose of Tralee (Frank Muir)
 Ch'ella mi creda from 'The Girl of the Golden West' by Puccini (John Amis)
 Oh Ma, Leave the Door Ajar (Denis Norden)
 My Love's An Arbutus (Ian Wallace)

Programme 5

 Tiptoe Through the Tulips (Frank Muir)
 Serenade from 'The Pearl Fishers' by Bizet (John Amis)
 Three Little Words (Denis Norden)
 Blackbird and Thrush Were Silent (Ian Wallace)

Programme 6

 I'm in the Mood for Love (Frank Muir)
 Aragonaise / Le Cid by Massinet (John Amis)
 Georgie & Mary (Denis Norden)
 The Girl That I Marry (Ian Wallace)

Programme 7

 Why Do I Love You? (Frank Muir)
 Cottlestone Pie (John Amis)
 It's A Well Known Fact (Denis Norden)
 A Cornish Lullaby (Ian Wallace)

Programme 8

 Apple Blossom Time (Frank Muir)
 Tell Me Tonight (John Amis)
 Nostalgia (Denis Norden)
 A Paradise for Two from 'Maid of the Mountains' (Ian Wallace)

Programme 9

 I'll Be Your Sweetheart (Frank Muir)
 Sally In Our Alley (John Amis)
 In the Woodshed, She Would (Denis Norden)
 Limehouse Reach (Ian Wallace)

Programme 10

 Whispering Grass (Frank Muir)
 Don Giovanni "Dalla sua pace" (John Amis)
 Oh Timothy, Let's Have A Look at It (Denis Norden)
 Annie Laurie (Ian Wallace)

Programme 11

 Cuddle Up A Little Closer (Frank Muir)
 Im wunderschönen Monat Mai from Dichterliebe By Schumann (John Amis)
 Mr Carter's Wife (Denis Norden)
 An Old Fashioned Town - The Witney Song (Ian Wallace)

Programme 12

 Tea for Two (Frank Muir)
 Thou art reposed peaceful rest - Schumann (John Amis)
 Bon Vivant - lyrics by Johnny Mercer (Denis Norden)
 Bless This House (Ian Wallace)

Programme 13

 The Honeysuckle and the Bee (Frank Muir)
 La belle est au jardin d'amour (John Amis)
 There's A Girl In The Heart Of Wheeling, West Virginia (With A Watch That Belongs To Me) (written by Harry Ruby) (Denis Norden)
 Love's Garden of Roses (Ian Wallace)

Programme 14

 My Old Dutch (Frank Muir)
 I Wonder as I Wander (John Amis)
 He Treated Me More Like A Friend (Denis Norden)
 Leanin’ (Ian Wallace)

Programme 15

 Darling Je Vous Aime Beaucoup (Frank Muir)
 The Shepherd's Daughter (John Amis)
 Louella (Denis Norden)
 The Sunshine of Your Smile (Ian Wallace)

Programme 16

 All of Me (Frank Muir)
 The Flowers (John Amis)
 A Strawberry Sunday (Denis Norden)
 The Ash Grove (Ian Wallace)

Programme 17

 Mean to Me (Frank Muir)
 Humoresque (Dvořák) (John Amis)
 She Don't Wanna (Denis Norden)
 Always (Jimmy Durenforth) (Ian Wallace)

Programme 18

 Paper Doll (Frank Muir)
 The Dickie-Bird Hop (John Amis)
 Tonight's My Night with Baby (Denis Norden)
 A Brown Bird Singing (Ian Wallace)

Programme 19

 The Hut Sut Song (Frank Muir)
 Oh my love she was born in the North country wide (John Amis)
 Oh Gussie! (Denis Norden)
 Believe Me If All Those Endearing Young Charms (Ian Wallace)

Programme 20

 Oh, You Beautiful Doll (Frank Muir)
 "Nel cor più non mi sento" Giovanni Paisiello's L'amor contrastato, (John Amis)
 I Wonder How I Look When I'm Asleep (Denis Norden)
 Beautiful Garden Of Roses (Ian Wallace)

Programme 21

 The Band Played On (Frank Muir)
 The Leafy Cool-kellure (John Amis)
 When Paderewski Plays (Denis Norden)
 Love Sends A Little Gift of Roses (Ian Wallace)

Programme 22

 All Alone (Frank Muir)
 Brindisi from La Traviata (John Amis)
 No Place Like Home (When there's Nowhere Else to Go) (Denis Norden)
 The Bonnie Earl O' Moray (Ian Wallace)

Programme 23/24 - unknown

Programme 25

 Wait Till the Sun Shines Nellie (Frank Muir)
 Bold William Taylor (John Amis)
 Oh, I Must Go Home Tonight (Denis Norden)
 When You And I Were Young Maggie (Ian Wallace)

Programme 26 - unknownSeries 19Programme 1

 At Sundown (Frank Muir)
 The Trout -Schubert (John Amis)
 Making Conversation When We Ought to Be Making Love (Denis Norden)
 Love Is A Very Light Thing from 'Fanny' (Ian Wallace)

Programme 2

 I Love My Baby (Frank Muir)
 Song of the Iowa River Boatmen (John Amis)
 My Cutie's Due At Two To Two (Denis Norden)
 The Old Songs (written by Steve Race)(Ian Wallace)

Programme 3

 Keep Your Sunny Side Up (Frank Muir)
 Aria from The Merry Widow' (John Amis)
 Sposin' (Denis Norden)
 We Parted On The Shore (Ian Wallace)

Programme 4

 The One I Love (Belongs to Somebody Else) (Frank Muir)
 Rich & Rare (John Amis)
 Have You Anything on, Matilda? (Denis Norden)
 Little Gypsy Sweetheart by Victor Herbert (Ian Wallace)

Programme 5

 Pennies from Heaven (Frank Muir)
 I Will Give My Love An Apple (John Amis)
 Looking at the World Through Rose Coloured Glasses (Denis Norden)
 My Ain Folk (Ian Wallace)

Programme 6

 Waiting for the Robert E. Lee (Frank Muir)
 The Kerry Piper (John Amis)
 Julius (Denis Norden)
 Old Man River (Ian Wallace)

Programme 7

 Hey Look Me Over (Frank Muir)
 Oh Wailey Wailey (John Amis)
 When My Ship Comes In (Denis Norden)
 The Rio Grande (Ian Wallace)

Programme 8 - missing

Programme 9

 My Melancholy Baby (Frank Muir)
 Music from 'Un ballo in maschera' by Verdi (John Amis)
 Your Mother's Son-in-Law (Denis Norden)
 Going Home (Ian Wallace)

Programme 10

 Yes Sir, That's My Baby (Frank Muir)
 Love Thee Dearest (John Amis)
 Your Baby Has Gone Down the Plughole (Denis Norden)
 The Cricketers of Hambledon (Ian Wallace)

Programme 11

 Good Morning (Frank Muir)
 O Mio Babbino Caro from 'Gianni Schicchi' by Puccini (John Amis)
 Sweetheart (Denis Norden)
 Donkey Riding (Ian Wallace)

Programme 12

 Tea for Two (Frank Muir)
 Thou art reposed peaceful rest - Schumann (John Amis)
 Bon Vivant - lyrics by Johnny Mercer (Denis Norden)
 Bless This House (Ian Wallace)

Programme 13

 It Is Only Paper Moon (Frank Muir)
 Love's Young Dream (John Amis)
 In My Little Red Book (Denis Norden)
 Down in the Glen (Ian Wallace)

Programme 14

 Gilbert the Filbert (Frank Muir)
 Folk Song orchestrated by Beethoven (John Amis)
 A Bench in the Park (Denis Norden)
 My Blue Eyed Mountain Queen (Ian Wallace)

Programme 15

 Every Little Moment (Frank Muir)
 She Wore A Wreath of Roses (John Amis)
 Don't Be Cruel to A Vegetabuel (Denis Norden)
 When that I was and a little tiny boy (Ian Wallace)

Programme 16

 Nice Work if You Can Get It (Frank Muir)
 Amor ti vieta from Fedora by Giordano (John Amis)
 Mandy - Irving Berlin (Denis Norden)
 My Heart Stood Still (Ian Wallace)

Programme  17 - missing

Programme 18

 That Certain Party (Frank Muir)
 Unknown Italian folk song (John Amis)
 Why Should the Rich Man Have It All? (Denis Norden)
 The Old Turf Fire (Ian Wallace)

Programme 19

 Hello, Hello Who's Your Lady Friend? (Frank Muir)
 Long Long Ago (John Amis)
 Gigolo and Gigolette (Denis Norden)
 The Very Thought of You (Ian Wallace)

Programme 20

 My Ragtime Gal (Frank Muir)
 The Lark in the Clear Air (John Amis)
 A Noise Annoys An Oyster (Denis Norden)
 Laura (Ian Wallace)

Programme 21

 The Nipper's Lullaby (Frank Muir)
 Yes We Have No Bananas (in German) (John Amis)
 Believe It, Beloved (Denis Norden)
 Beautiful Dreamer (Ian Wallace)

Programme 22

 Easy Street (Frank Muir)
 Ah, Moon of My Delight (John Amis)
 At the Willows (Denis Norden)
 The Old House (Ian Wallace)

Programme 23

 Nobody's Using it Now (Frank Muir)
 Died for Love (John Amis)
 All Those Things That You Taught Me (Denis Norden)
 When A Woman Smiles (Ian Wallace)

Programme 24 - missing

Programme 25

 Auf Wiedersehen, My Dear (Frank Muir)
 The Bell Song from 'Lakme' (John Amis)
 Who's Stuffing Your Turkey This Christmas? (Denis Norden)
 Just Because the Violets by Fred Weatherly (Ian Wallace)

Programme 26

 Hello, Hello Who's Your Lady Friend? (Frank Muir)
 Long Long Ago (John Amis)
 Gigolo and Gigolette (Denis Norden)
 The Very Thought of You (Ian Wallace)

1983 Christmas Special (21 December 1983)

 Tiptoe Through the Tulips (Frank Muir)
 Baby Born in Bethlehem (John Amis)
 The Handsome Major (Denis Norden)
 The Virgin Mary Had a Baby Boy (Ian Wallace)Series 20Programme 1

 I'm On A See-Saw (Frank)
 The Toy Trumpet (John)
 Anytime (Dennis)
 Drink to Me Only with Thine Eyes (Ian)
Programme 2
 I've Got A Wonderful Feeling (Frank)
 If My Complaints (John)
 Linger Awhile (Dennis)
 The Last Time I Saw Paris (Ian)

Programme 3

 I'll See You Again (Frank Muir)
 The Little Houses (John Amis)
 I Love to Lie Awake in Bed (Denis Norden)
 Some Enchanted Evening (Ian Wallace)

Programme 4

 Get Out & Get Under (Frank Muir)
 Schubert's Serenade (John Amis)
 She's More to Be Pitied Than Censured (Denis Norden)
 Down Below (Ian Wallace)

Programme 5

 There's A Small Hotel (Frank Muir)
 She Left Me With a Bunch of Watercress (John Amis)
 Put a Bit of Powder on It Father (Denis Norden)
 Sylvia (Ian Wallace)

Programme 6

 Don't Have Any More Mrs Moore (Frank Muir)
 unknown(John Amis)
 A Personal Friend of Mine (Denis Norden)
 A Nightingale Sang in Berkeley Square (Ian Wallace)

Programme 7

 Did You Ever See A Dream Walking? (Frank Muir)
 Tell Me Where Is Fancy Bread (John Amis)
 Brown Eyes Why Are You Blue? (Denis Norden)
 Oh Mistress Mine (Ian Wallace)

Programme 8

 Deep Purple (Frank Muir)
 My One & Only (John Amis)
 I Love Me (Denis Norden)
 She's My Lovely (Ian Wallace)

Programme 9

 Down the Road (Frank Muir)
 Tis' the Gift to Be Simple (John Amis)
 The Pig Got Up  & Slowly Walked Away (Denis Norden)
 Smoke Gets in Your Eyes (Ian Wallace)
Programme 10

 Ramona (Frank Muir)
 Don't Put Your Daughter on the Stage Mrs Worthington - as Maurice Chevalier (John Amis)
 I Love to Dance Like They Used to Dance (Denis Norden)
 I'll Walk Beside You (Ian Wallace)

Programme 11

 Lily of Laguna (Frank Muir)
 Theme from 'Soap' (John Amis)
 What Happens After the Ball? (Denis Norden)
 Easter Parade (Ian Wallace)

Programme 12

 Boiled Beef & Carrots (Frank Muir)
 Song from 'Cymbeline' (John Amis)
 Outside (Denis Norden)
 A Policeman's Lot (Ian Wallace)

Programme 13

 Imagination (Frank Muir)
 The Brisk Young Widow (John Amis)
 The Girl With the Dreamy Eyes (Denis Norden)
 If You Could Care for Me (Ian Wallace)

Programme 14

 Margie (Frank Muir)
 Down by the Sally Lunn (John Amis)
 And Everything (Denis Norden)
 Tis' the Last Rose of Summer (Ian Wallace)

Programme 15

 Manhattan (Frank)
 The Housewives Lament (John)
 Never Let Your Braces Dangle (Dennis)
 Stardust (Ian)

Programme 16 - unknown

Programme 17

 The Pride of Idaho (Frank)
 unknown Fritz Kreisler tune (John)
 You Know What I Mean (Dennis)
 Loch Lomond (Ian)

Programme 18

 A Pretty Girl is Like A Melody (Frank)
 She's Like the Swallow (John)
 I Love to Go Swimming With Women (Dennis)
 Mary's A Grand Old Name (Ian)

Programme 19

 When You & I Were Seventeen (Frank)
 Spare, Oh Spare My Baby's Chair (Dennis)
 Ye Banks and Braes (Ian & John)

Programme 20

 · If You Knew Susie (Frank Muir)
 · Rufford Park (John Amis)
 · If I Could Be With You One Hour Tonight (Denis Norden)
 · Off to Philadelphia (Ian Wallace)

Programme 21

 When We Are Married (Frank)
 Aria by Cilea from L'arlesiana (John Amis)
 Down Where the Cross Eyed Claras Go (Dennis)
 I'm Old fashioned (Ian)

Programme 22

 Don't Get Around Much Anymore (Frank)
 unknown Scottish folk song (John Amis)
 It's A Man Every Time (Dennis)
 The Lost Chord (Ian)

Programme 23

 Ain't Misbehavin' (Frank)
 The Fathers of Zion (John)
 Moonlight Saving Time (Denis)
 Wandering the King's Highway (Ian)

Programme 24

 Put Me Among the Girls (Frank)
 Una Fair (John)
 Mable (Denis)
 Welcome Home (Ian)

Programme 25

 I Want to Be Happy (Frank)
 Aria from 'Manon' by Massinet (John)
 I Do Like an Egg for My Tea (Denis)
 Turn Ye Tae Me (Ian)

Programme 26 - unknown

Christmas Special

 I'm Going to Get Lit Up (Frank)
 All the days of Christmas (John Amis)
 Give Me the Kingston Bypass (Dennis)
 Let the punishment fit the crime - from the Mikado (Ian)Series 22/23/24 - unknownSeries 25Programme 1

 I'll Be Your Sweetheart (Frank)
 Toy Trumpet (John)
 Nothing (Dennis)
 The Sunshine of Your Smile (Ian)
Programme 2 - unknown

Programme 3

 My Baby Just Cares for Me (Frank)
 Drigo's Serenade (John)
 Do You Want Any Dirty Work Done? (Dennis)
 All the Things You Are (Kern) (Ian)
Programme 4

 Don't Get Around Much Anymore (Frank)
 Aria from The Girl of the Golden West by Puccini (John)
 I'm Knitting A Singlet for Cecil (Dennis)
 In An Old Fashioned Town (The Whitney Song) (Ian)
Programme 5

 There's A Small Hotel (Rogers & Hart) (Frank)
 Pavanne by Morton Gould (John)
 Our Avenue (Dennis)
 Oh Gin ! Were a Baron's Air (Ian)
Programme 6

 Ma He's Making Eyes At Me (Frank)
 Serenade from 'The Student Prince' (John)
 One of the Thousand Islands (Dennis)
 Fold Your Wings from 'Glamorous Night' by Ivor Novello (Ian)
Programme 7

 Get Out and Get Under (Frank)
 Oh Maiden, My Maiden from 'Frederica' by Lehar (John)
 Are You Lonesome Tonight (parody) (Dennis)
 Love Walked In (Ian)
Programme 8 - unknownSeries 26Programme 1

 I've Got a Motto (Frank)
 Pavanne by Faurre (John)
 When I've Got my Bolshevik Blood Up (Dennis)
 Old Father Thames (Ian)

Programme 2

 J'Attendrai (Frank)
 Black is the Colour of My True Love's Hair (John)
 Little Willie's Woodbines (Dennis)
 You Are My Honeysuckle (Ian)

Programme 3

 Nellie Dean (Frank)
 Polka from 'Facade' by Walton (John)
 Since Charlie Did His Courting in A Chalk Pit (Dennis)
 The Moment I Saw You  (Ian)

Programme 4

 If I Had a Talking Picture of You (Frank)
 Bonnie at Morn (John)
 One of the Best (Dennis)
 Stardust (Ian)

Programme 5

 Goodbye Sally (Frank)
 Salut d'Amour (Elgar) (John)
 Don't Mention My Name (Dennis)
 If The Heart of a Man from 'The Beggar's Opera' (Ian)

Programme 6

 Everybody's Doin' It (Frank)
 The Sussex Mama's Carol (John)
 The Tears Shed in London Tonight (Weston and Lee) (Dennis)
 Where or When (Ian)

Programme 7

 A Foggy Day (in London Town) (Frank)
 La Ci Darem la Mano from 'Don Giovanni' by Mozart(John)
 Love 'em and Leave 'em Joe (Dennis)
 Turn Ye Tay Me (Ian)

Programme 8 (The 500th Programme)

 My Dear Old Dutch (Frank)
 The Rose (John)
 He Was More Like A Friend Than A Husband (Dennis)
 For You Alone (Ian)Series 27Programme 1

 Music Maestro Please (Frank)
 Love Song by Bach (John)
 Don't Do Your Courting Round the Gate Post (Dennis)
 Nature Boy (eden ardez) (Ian)
Programme 2
 I've Told Every Little Star (Frank)
 Dusk (Armstrong Gibbs) (Steve)
 Waltz by Brahms (John)
 You Ought To Know Better, A Big Girl Like You (Dennis)
 Come to the Fair (Helen Taylor and Easthope Martin) (Ian)
Programme 3

 Down the Road (Frank)
 A Fairy Went A-Marketing (John)
 Heaven Will Protect an Honest Girl (Dennis)
 Songs For Our Time  (Oly-ma-kitty-luca-chi-chi-chi) (Ian)

Programme 4

 I Don't Know Why (I Just Do) (Frank)
 Long Lonely Year (Swann) (John)
 Hard to be Humble (Dennis)
 Gentle Maiden (Steve)
 Bonnie Mary of Argyll (Ian)

Programme 5

 Just Like the Ivy (Frank)
 Habanera from 'Carmen' (Bizet) (John)
 Men of Harlech (parody) (Dennis)
 A Gordon for Me (Ian)

Programmes 6/7/8 - unknownSeries 28Programme 1

 The Sun Has Got His Hat On (Noel Gay and Ralph Butler) (Frank)
 Lament by Cilea (John)
 Lips that Touched Kipper Shall Never Touch Mine (Dennis)
 (The Rollicking) Gay Highway (Ian)
Programme 2
 The Galloping Major (Fred W. Leigh and George Bastow) (Frank)
 Amazing Grace (John)
 You are my Girl-ski (George Arthurs & Worton David) (Dennis)
 She's the Perfect Wife  (Ian)

Programme 3

 Don't Bring Lulu (Billy Rose, Lew Brown, and Ray Henderson) (Frank)
 Try to Remember (Tom Jones) (John)
 Please Don't Send me Down A Baby Brother (Arthur Schwarz & Dorothy Fields) (Dennis)
 Can I Forget You (Kern) (Ian)

Programme 4

 She's Only A Bird in A Guided Cage (Frank)
 Humoresque (Dvorak) (John)
 Romeo (Dennis)
 Brigg Fair (Steve)
 She Moves Through the Fair (Ian)

Programme 5

 I'm On A See-Saw (Vivian Ellis) (Frank)
 Theme from 'Whistle Down the Wind' (Malcolm Arnold) (John)
 Sophie (I go so far with Sophie and Sophie goes so far with me) (Dennis)
 Love is a Very Light Thing (Ian)

Programme 6

 What'll I Do (Berlin) (Frank)
 Cara Nome from Rigoletto (Verdi) (John)
 Mrs Binns Twins (Dennis)
 Love is the Sweetest Thing (Steve)
 The Very Thought of You (Ian)

Programme 7

 You're Getting to Be A Habit With Me (Mercer) (Frank)
 The Whistler and His Dog (Arthur Prior) (John)
 What Percy's Picked up in the Park (Dennis)
 Make Believe (Kern) (Steve)
 Long Ago and far Away (Kern) (Ian)

Programme 8

 Other Peoples Babies (Frank)
 Oh Mistress Mine (Shakespeare) (John)
 Are You Lonesome Tonight (parody) (Dennis)
 Oh Marie!(Ian)Series 29'''

Programme 1

 All Alone (Frank)
 Saturday Night Waltz from the ballet 'Rodeo' by Aaron Copeland (John)
 He Touched Me (Dennis)
 In an Old-Fashioned Town (The Witney Song) (Ian)

Programme 2

 After You’ve Gone (Frank)
 Master Kilby (John)
 You Have to Show It to Mother Before You Show It To Me (Dennis)
 Laura (Ian)

Programme 3

 C’est Magnifique (Frank)
 Bilbow's Last Song (John & Ian)
 They're Moving Father's Grave to Build a Sewer (Dennis)
 The Kashmiri Song (Pale hands I Loved Beside the Shalimar) (Steve)
 The Old Songs (Ian)

Programme 4

 Dream (Frank)
 I Wonder As I Wander (John)
 I Shan't Mend Your Waistcoat Any More (Dennis)
 Limehouse Reach (Ian)

Programme 5

 Get Out & Get Under the Moon (Frank)
 Theme by Borodin (John)
 Will You Love Me When I'm Mutton? (Dennis)
 The Gentle Maiden (Steve)
 Oh Marie (Ian)

Programme 6

 In A Shady Nook (By A Babbling Brook) (Frank)
 King Henry (John) 
 Did Your First Wife Ever Do That? (Dennis)
 Smoke Gets In Your Eyes (Ian)

Programme 7

 What'll I Do? 
 Habanera from Ravel's 'Rhapsody Espagnol' (John)
 Only Once A Night  (Denis)
 Bonnie Mary of Argyle (Ian)

Programme 8

 Who's Sorry Now (Frank)
 The Blonde in the Gondola (John) 
 Sissy (Dennis)
 I Love the Moon (Steve)   
 Moon River (Ian)

See also
 Face the Music (TV series) - a similarly lighthearted contest broadcast on BBC Television.

References

Further reading
Race, Steve (1979) My Music;  with the contributions of Frank Muir, Denis Norden, Ian Wallace, John Amis and David Franklin; drawings by John Jensen. London: Robson  (Based on the radio and television programme My Music, "the panel game originated by Edward J. Mason and Tony Shryane.")

External links
 My Music'' by Steve Race (1980)
 My Music - WFMT (at Internet Archive)

Musical game shows
BBC Radio comedy programmes
International classical music radio programs
British classical music radio programmes
British radio game shows
1960s British game shows
1970s British game shows
1980s British game shows
1990s British game shows
1967 radio programme debuts
1994 radio programme endings
Radio game shows with incorrect disambiguation